Ernest J. "Goof" Bowyer (October 2, 1903 – May 19, 1988) was an American football and basketball coach and college athletics administrator. He served as the head football coach at Florida Southern College from 1931 to 1932.

Early years
Bowyer attended Gainesville High, playing football for J. Rex Farrior and winning a state title. He then attended Lakeland High School in 1923, where he was again quarterback of the Florida state champion team.

University of Florida
Bowyer attended the University of Florida. He played for coach Tom Sebring and Charlie Bachman's Florida Gators football teams from 1925 to 1928. He was captain of the freshman team his first year, and captain of the varsity in his senior season. In 1927, he broke his leg against Georgia, and was elected captain one month later. Bowyer was one of the school's greatest ever senior captains, leading what was remembered by many sports commentators as the best Florida football team until at least the 1960s.

Coaching career
After serving as an assistant for his former high school, Bowyer was hired as head football coach and athletic director for the Florida Southern Moccasins. His 1932 basketball team posted a 10–3 record. In 1933 Bowyer took over as the Florida Gators backfield coach after the departure of Joe Holsinger, his former backfield coach.

Death
Bowyer died on May 19, 1988.

Head coaching record

College football

See also
 List of University of Florida Athletic Hall of Fame members

References

1903 births
1988 deaths
American football quarterbacks
Florida Gators football players
Florida Southern Moccasins athletic directors
Florida Southern Moccasins football coaches
Florida Southern Moccasins men's basketball coaches
High school football coaches in Florida
Lakeland High School (Lakeland, Florida) alumni
Coaches of American football from Florida
Players of American football from Gainesville, Florida
Players of American football from Tampa, Florida
Basketball coaches from Florida